Joy Rides for Shut-Ins is the first studio album recorded by The Cavedogs.

Track listing
All songs written by The Cavedogs
"Tayter Country" – 2:16
"Leave Me Alone" – 3:37
"Bed of Nails" – 3:22
"Proud Land" – 3:44
"What In The World?" – 3:06
"Right On The Nail" – 4:33
"Step Down" – 3:37
"Baba Ghanooj" – 4:22
"Calm Him Down" – 3:52
"Taking Up Space" – 3:28
"La La La" – 2:37
"[Hidden Track]" – 0:24

Personnel 

The Cavedogs – Producer, Engineer
Mike Denneen – Piano
Paul Hamingson – Engineer, Remix Assistant
Paul Q. Kolderie – Engineer
John Lupfer – Producer, Engineer
Michael McLaughlin – Photography
Suzanne Mueller – cellist (Baba Ghanooj)
Carl Plaster – Engineer
Mark Rivers – Bass, Drums, Keyboards, Vocals, Producer
Sean Slade – Engineer
Todd Spahr – Guitar, Vocals, Bells, Producer, Sleigh Bells
Ed Stasium – Producer, Engineer, Remixing
Brian Stevens – Bass, Harmonica, Vocals, Producer

Charts

Album
Billboard (North America)

Singles
Billboard (North America)

References

Cavedogs albums
1990 debut albums
Albums produced by Ed Stasium
Enigma Records albums